Vítor Emanuel Prazeres de Almeida (born 5 February 1991) is a Portuguese footballer who plays for Atlético as a defender.

Football career
On 20 August 2014, Almeida made his professional debut with Atlético in a 2014–15 Taça da Liga match against Beira-Mar.

References

External links

Stats and profile at LPFP 

1991 births
Living people
Footballers from Lisbon
Portuguese footballers
Association football defenders
Liga Portugal 2 players
Atlético Clube de Portugal players